Phaps is a genus of bronzewing pigeons in the family Columbidae that are native to Australia.

The genus was introduced in 1835 by the English naturalist Prideaux John Selby with the common bronzewing (Phaps chalcoptera) as the type species. The genus name Phaps is the Ancient Greek word for a pigeon.

The genus contains three species:
 Common bronzewing, P. chalcoptera
 Brush bronzewing, P. elegans
 Flock bronzewing, P. histrionica

References

 
Bird genera
Taxa named by Prideaux John Selby